The  23rd Infantry Regiment was an infantry regiment in the Imperial Japanese Army. The regiment was attached to the 6th Infantry Brigade of the 6th Division and participated during the Second Sino-Japanese War. The regiment fought in the later stages of World War II, assigned to the Japanese Seventeenth Army at Bougainville Island in the Solomon Islands.

Organization
1st Battalion
2nd Battalion
3rd Battalion

Notes

Infantry Regiments (Imperial Japanese Army)